Blood Money is a 1917 American silent Western film directed by Fred Kelsey and starring Harry Carey.

Cast
 Harry Carey
 Louise Lovely
 Vester Pegg
 Jack Richardson
 William Steele - (as William Gettinger)

See also
 List of American films of 1917
 Harry Carey filmography

External links
 

1917 films
1917 Western (genre) films
1917 short films
American silent short films
American black-and-white films
Films directed by Fred Kelsey
Universal Pictures short films
Silent American Western (genre) films
1910s American films
1910s English-language films